Kelly Meafua (16 October 1990 – 6 May 2022) was a Samoan rugby union player.  His position of choice was flanker.

Club career 
Meafua moved to Auckland when he was 14 but did not start playing rugby until he joined Otahuhu at 20 years old. He played for both the Auckland under–21 and Auckland Sevens before moving to Sydney to play for West Harbour in the Shute Shield. Meafua then played for the Greater Sydney Rams and was part of the Waratahs extended training squad.

Professional career 
In 2013 Meafua played for the Samoa sevens team in the World Rugby Sevens Series before in 2015 he moved to France to play for Narbonne in the French Pro D2. He returned to France again in 2018, this time playing for Béziers in the Pro D2 before in 2020 he switched to Montauban.

Personal life
Meafua was from the villages of Sala'ilua and Lalomauga and grew up in Samoa.

On the 6 May 2022 while celebrating Montauban final home game and a win over Narbonne, Meafua died after jumping off the Pont-Vieux bridge into the river Tarn.

References

External links 
Player profile - All Rugby
Player profile - Its Rugby

1990 births
2022 deaths 
Samoan rugby union players
US Montauban players
Rugby union flankers
Greater Sydney Rams players
RC Narbonne players
New South Wales Waratahs players
AS Béziers Hérault players
Rugby union number eights